HAT-P-7 is a F-type main sequence star located about 1088 light-years away in the constellation Cygnus. The apparent magnitude of this star is 10.5, which means it is not visible to the naked eye but can be seen with a small telescope on a clear dark night.

Planetary system
This star has only one known planet, HAT-P-7b. This star system was within the initial field of view of the Kepler planet-hunting spacecraft.

See also
 HATNet Project
 Kepler Mission

References

External links
 

Cygnus (constellation)
F-type main-sequence stars
Planetary systems with one confirmed planet
Planetary transit variables
2